Matthew Jonathan Raggett (born 1972) is a British educator, writer and the former Headmaster of The Doon School, the all-boys boarding school in Dehradun, India. He succeeded Peter McLaughlin in 2016, becoming the tenth headmaster of the school. Raggett left Doon in January 2020 and returned to Germany. He was the fourth Englishman in Doon's history to head the school and was a member of The Headmasters' and Headmistresses' Conference, UK. Jagpreet Singh succeeded him as headmaster, and joined the school in June 2020.

Education 
Raggett went to the University of Newcastle and received a BSc in Physics and Applied Maths, a PGCE from the University of Worcester and then an MBA from Charles Sturt University in Australia. He credits the time he spent working for the United World Colleges, at Pearson College and UWCSEA, Singapore, as instrumental in his development as an international educator.

Career 
Raggett was the Secondary Principal of Leipzig International School from 2009 – 2016. He then joined the Doon School, succeeding Peter McLaughlin as the tenth Headmaster of the all-boys Round Square school in Dehradun. In April 2018, he featured prominently in Indian Summer School, a Channel 4 documentary and educational experiment in which five working class British boys spent a six months in Doon with the purpose of improving their grades.

At Doon, Raggett worked to improve the quality of teaching and learning, grow the provision for pastoral care and implement the Cambridge IGCSE assessment for Grade 10 that the previous board and Headmaster had introduced. This was in addition to developing the already existing International Baccalaureate and Indian School Certificate programmes. Along with the board of governors and the DSOBS, Raggett focused on making more scholarships available to those in need and on making the school more accessible to boys from parts of India that were less represented at Doon in the past decade, especially the Northeast and South India.

He wrote Your Child's First Steps Towards Success and How Your Child Can Win in Life  both published by Juggernaut Books in 2019. In January 2020, he stepped down as the tenth headmaster of Doon, citing the need to return to Germany to be closer to his daughter and wife. Raggett now leads an educational consultancy, MR Ed Partners, based in Leipzig, Germany, which helps global institutions improve their pedagogical practices in various ways, including better design and architecture. MR Ed Partners is currently working with VITALIS European Projects to develop their offerings for students and teachers coming to Germany through the Erasmus programme.

Raggett is a member of the GRJ Education team which provides real-time, case based leadership development for middle and senior leaders for schools in the UK, particularly HMC and SCIS schools, and for British schools overseas and international schools.

Raggett is also working with the EdTech company Dextres in India as a member of their School Success Team. Dextres is creating the ecosystem and process to train and develop world class teachers and academic leaders for India and the region.

Bibliography
 How Your Child Can Win in Life (2019), Juggernaut Books,

References

Further reading
 How Your Child Can Win in Life: The Doon School Headmaster on Raising Kids Who Love to Learn by Matthew Raggett, Juggernaut Books, 2019 
 Chhota Hazri Days: A Dosco's Yatra by Sanjiv Bathla, Rupa & Co., 2010 .
 The Corporeal Image by David McDougall, Princeton University Press, 2006, .
 Doon, The Story of a School, IPSS (1985) edited by Sumer Singh, published by the Indian Public Schools Society 1985.
 Constructing Post-Colonial India: National Character and the Doon School by Sanjay Srivastva, published by Routledge 1998 .

External links 
 Official Page

1973 births
Alumni of Newcastle University
Alumni of the University of Worcester
Charles Sturt University people
Headmasters of The Doon School
Living people